Alex O'Brien was the defending champion, but lost in the second round to Marc-Kevin Goellner.

Yevgeny Kafelnikov won the title by defeating Patrick Rafter 7–6(7–4), 6–4 in the final.

Seeds
The first eight seeds received a bye into the second round.

Draw

Finals

Top half

Section 1

Section 2

Bottom half

Section 3

Section 4

References

External links
 Official results archive (ATP)
 Official results archive (ITF)

1997 ATP Tour
Volvo International
Singles